Franco Menichelli (born 3 August 1941) is a retired Italian gymnast. He competed in all artistic gymnastics events at the 1960, 1964 and 1968 Olympics and won one gold, one silver, and three bronze 
medals.

Biography
He was most successful in 1964, when he won a gold on the floor, a silver on rings and a bronze on parallel bars. He severely injured an Achilles tendon on landing during the floor exercise at the 1968 Olympics, and retired shortly thereafter. From 1973 to 1979 he coached the national gymnastics team. In 2003 he was inducted into the International Gymnastics Hall of Fame.

His brother Giampaolo Menichelli was an international football player.

Awards
On 7 May 2015, in the presence of the President of Italian National Olympic Committee (CONI), Giovanni Malagò, was inaugurated in the Olympic Park of the Foro Italico in Rome, along Viale delle Olimpiadi, the Walk of Fame of Italian sport, consisting of 100 tiles that chronologically report names of the most representative athletes in the history of Italian sport. On each tile are the name of the sportsman, the sport in which he distinguished himself and the symbol of CONI. One of these tiles is dedicated to Franco Menichelli.

See also
 Legends of Italian sport - Walk of Fame

References

External links

1941 births
Living people
Italian male artistic gymnasts
Gymnasts at the 1960 Summer Olympics
Gymnasts at the 1964 Summer Olympics
Gymnasts at the 1968 Summer Olympics
Olympic gymnasts of Italy
Olympic gold medalists for Italy
Olympic silver medalists for Italy
Olympic bronze medalists for Italy
Olympic medalists in gymnastics
Medalists at the 1964 Summer Olympics
Medalists at the 1960 Summer Olympics
Medalists at the World Artistic Gymnastics Championships
European champions in gymnastics